Ron Christopher "Chris" Douglas (born 28 August 1980) is a Caymanian footballer who plays as a defender. He has represented the Cayman Islands during World Cup qualifying match in 2010.

References

Association football defenders
Living people
1980 births
Caymanian footballers
Cayman Islands international footballers